The R412 is a Regional Route in South Africa.

Route
Its northern terminus is the R56 at Ugie. It runs south-east to the R61 near Mthatha.

References

Regional Routes in the Eastern Cape